Robin Lynn Martin is a Canadian politician, who was elected to the Legislative Assembly of Ontario in the 2018 provincial election. She represents the riding of Eglinton—Lawrence as a member of the Progressive Conservative Party of Ontario. Martin ran in Eglinton-Lawrence in 2014 but lost to incumbent Liberal Mike Colle. She defeated Colle in a re-match in 2018. Prior to being elected into the Ontario Legislature, Martin practiced litigation for over a decade at Osler and Lenczner

Early life
Robin Martin was born in Saskatoon, Saskatchewan to Gord and Ruth. She was a child of two. In 1989, Robin married her high-school sweetheart Jon Martin. They had two children in 1993 and 1995. Martin holds a joint Honours undergraduate degree in Political Science and History from McGill University in Montreal. Upon graduation, she received Guy F. Drummond scholarship for one year to attend L'Institut d’etudes politiques de Paris in France. After her return, she received a Masters Degree from McGill University in Political Theory. She studied with renowned Canadian philosopher Charles Taylor. In 1991, Robin graduated with a law degree from the University of Toronto.

Prior to Election
In 1993, Martin was called to the bar and practiced law for over 10 years specializing in litigation. She then worked as a policy advisor within Ontario's Ministry of Health. Following the defeat of the then-Conservative government, Martin went on to work at StrategyCorp.

Political career
In June 2018, Martin was elected as a member of provincial parliament defeating long-time incumbent Mike Colle. She was sworn in as Parliamentary Assistant to the Minister of Health and Long-Term Care (Health) on June 29, 2018 and reappointed as Parliamentary Assistant to the Minister of Health on June 26, 2019.

In November 2019, MPP Martin introduced her first Private Members' Bill, the Defibrillator Registration and Public Access Act. The act received unanimous support from across party lines at Second and Third readings, and is estimated to save 1,500 people annually by increasing access to defibrillators.

In response to financial pressures on local businesses within Martin's riding of Eglinton-Lawrence during the COVID-19 pandemic, Martin proposed property tax reforms in March 2020 to help businesses stay solvent. These measures would later be incorporated into, and passed as part of the Ontario government's 2020 budget. In November of the same year, Martin proposed a motion requiring school boards across Ontario to adopt an anti-human trafficking protocol, which passed unanimously and was later adopted by the Ministry of Education.

Martin has been a strong advocate for the Jewish community within Eglinton-Lawrence since her election to the provincial legislature. In 2020, Martin joined Brantford-Brant MPP Will Bouma in co-sponsoring Bill 168, officially known as the Combating Antisemitism Act. The act called for the Ontario government to formally adopt the International Holocaust Remembrance Alliance definition of antisemitism. During April 2021, Martin proposed a motion which would establish a Holocaust memorial on the grounds of the Legislative Assembly of Ontario. The motion passed with unanimous consent.

Electoral record

References

Progressive Conservative Party of Ontario MPPs
21st-century Canadian politicians
21st-century Canadian women politicians
Women MPPs in Ontario
Politicians from Toronto
Living people
Lawyers in Ontario
Canadian women lawyers
Year of birth missing (living people)